The Rincon Mountains (O'odham: Cew Doʼag) are a significant mountain range east of Tucson, Pima County, Arizona, in the United States. The Rincon Mountains are one of five mountain ranges surrounding the Tucson valley. The other ranges include the most prominent, the Santa Catalina Mountains to the north, the Santa Rita Mountains to the south, the Tucson Mountains to the west, and the Tortolita Mountains to the northwest. Redington Pass separates the Rincon Mountains from the Santa Catalina Mountains. The Rincon Mountains are generally less rugged than the Santa Catalina Mountains and Santa Rita Mountains.  The Rincon Mountains are also included in the Madrean sky island mountain ranges of southeast Arizona, extreme southwest New Mexico, and northern Sonora Mexico.

Rincón is Spanish for corner, denoting the primary shape of the mountain range.  Mica Mountain (8,664 feet), the high-point of the Rincons forms the apex, with Rincon Peak (8,482 feet) forming the southern point, and Tanque Verde Peak (7,049 feet) forming the western point of the corner.  The interior of the corner is Rincon Valley (south and west of Mica Mountain), primarily former ranchland currently being converted to tract housing. Colossal Cave county park, a limestone cave and popular destination, is located on the east end of the Rincon Valley, north of the community of Vail.

East of the Rincons are the Little Rincon Mountains. Between these two ranges is Happy Valley, a popular destination for locals for camping, hunting, and off-roading. Farther east is the San Pedro River of the San Pedro Valley, a holocene paleontology region.

South of the Rincon Mountains, beyond Rincon Valley is the Cienega Creek and Interstate 10.

Most of the Rincon Mountains are within Saguaro National Park, or in the Rincon Mountain Wilderness, of the Coronado National Forest.

Trails
The majority of the range is off-limits to motorized & bicycle travel. The mountains can be accessed on foot or horseback by the following routes:
East Side
Turkey Creek Trail
Miller Creek Trail
North Side
Italian Ranch (Italian Springs) Trail
Espiritu Creek Trail (inaccessible - dense overgrowth)
West Side
Douglas Springs Trail
Tanque Verde Ridge Trail
South Side
Madrona/Manning Camp Trail (inaccessible - trailhead located on private land)

The Arizona Trail passes through the Rincons, entering from the north by the Italian Spring trail, and southwest by the Quilter Trail

See also
List of mountain ranges of Pima County, Arizona
List of mountain ranges of Arizona
List of Arizona Wilderness Areas

Further reading
The Mountains Next Door by Janice Emily Bowers
Papers of the Manning Family, 1860-2001 (University of Arizona Library Special Collections)
"Flora and Vegetation of the Rincon Mountains, Pima County, Arizona", by Janice Emily Bowers
"Fire History of the Rincon Mountain Wilderness, Saguaro National Monument" by Baisan, Christopher

External links
Rincon Wilderness Hikes - hikearizona.com
Sierra club trail guide
Rincon Institute - conservation

Madrean Sky Islands mountain ranges
Mountain ranges of Arizona
Mountain ranges of Pima County, Arizona
Protected areas of Pima County, Arizona
Wilderness areas of Arizona
Coronado National Forest